The 1951–52 season in Swedish football, starting August 1951 and ending July 1952:

Honours

Official titles

Competitions

Promotions, relegations and qualifications

Promotions

Relegations

Domestic results

Allsvenskan 1951–52

Division 2 Nordöstra 1951–52

Division 2 Sydvästra 1951–52

Norrländska Mästerskapet 1952 
Final

Svenska Cupen 1951 
Final

National team results

Notes

References 
Print

Online

 
Seasons in Swedish football